Jerry Mumford Patterson (born October 25, 1934) is an American lawyer in California and the District of Columbia, educator and politician, who was a five-term United States Representative from California, serving from 1975 to 1985.

Early life, education, military service
Born in El Paso, Texas, Patterson graduated from Tucson High School in Tucson, Arizona in 1952. He served in the United States Coast Guard from 1953 to 1957. Patterson received his BA from California State University, Long Beach in 1960. He completed 30 units of graduate work at the University of Southern California School of Public Administration in 1961 to 1963, then went on to UCLA School of Law where he earned his J.D. degree in 1966.

Legal and political career 
He was admitted to the California bar in 1967 and commenced practice in Santa Ana. He was a Santa Ana city councilman from 1969 to 1973. He was concurrently the mayor of Santa Ana and the city attorney of Placentia from 1973 to 1975.

House of Representatives
Congressman Patterson was the first Democrat to be elected to Congress from a district entirely within Orange County, California. He served five terms from January 3, 1975, until January 3, 1985, when he lost his reelection bid to Bob Dornan.
He served as chairman of the Select Committee on Committee Reform (Ninety-sixth Congress), and chaired the House Subcommittee on International Development Finance in the Ninety-seventh and Ninety-eighth Congress.  Patterson was also a member of the United States House Select Committee on Children, Youth, and Families

Post-political career
He resumed the practice of law in Costa Mesa in 1986.  He was a professor at California State University, Long Beach from 1986 to 1999. He became the  city attorney of Cypress in 1987, Dana Point, California in 1989 and Lake Forest, California in 1991. Patterson retired from his law practice in 1997 and has been president of his own public affairs consulting firm since 1998. Patterson continues to be an educator, community activist and member of nonprofit boards and commissions. In 1996 Patterson returned to elective office when he won a seat on the Coast Community College District Board of Trustees where he continues to serve on the college board for Orange Coast College, Golden West College and Coastline Community College.

Personal life
Patterson lives in Fountain Valley, with his wife, Linda Moulton-Patterson. They have four adult children and six grandchildren.

References

External links
Guide to the Jerry M. Patterson Papers. Special Collections and Archives, The UC Irvine Libraries, Irvine, California.
Official Coast Community College District Board biography

1934 births
Living people
California lawyers
American Congregationalists
UCLA School of Law alumni
Democratic Party members of the United States House of Representatives from California
United States Coast Guard enlisted
USC Sol Price School of Public Policy alumni
Members of Congress who became lobbyists